Events from the year 1803 in the United States.

Incumbents

Federal Government 
 President: Thomas Jefferson (DR-Virginia)
 Vice President: Aaron Burr (DR-New York)
 Chief Justice: John Marshall (Virginia)
 Speaker of the House of Representatives: Nathaniel Macon (DR-North Carolina)
 Congress: 7th (until March 4), 8th (starting March 4)

Events

 January 30 – Monroe and Livingston sail for Paris to discuss, and possibly buy, New Orleans; they end completing the Louisiana Purchase.
 February 24 – Marbury v. Madison: The Supreme Court of the United States establishes the principle of judicial review.
 March 1 – Ohio is admitted as the 17th U.S. state, retroactive from August 7, 1953 (see History of Ohio).
 April  30 – Louisiana Purchase is made by the United States from France.
 July 4 – The Louisiana Purchase is announced to the American people.
 October 20 – The Senate ratifies the Louisiana Purchase Treaty, doubling the size of the United States.
 November 30 – At the Cabildo building in New Orleans, Spanish representatives Governor Manuel de Salcedo and the Marqués de Casa Calvo, officially transfer Louisiana (New Spain) to French representative Prefect Pierre Clément de Laussat. Barely three weeks later, on December 20, France transfers the same land to the United States as the Sale of Louisiana.

Ongoing
 First Barbary War (1801–1805)

Births
 January 19 – Sarah Helen Whitman, poet, essayist, transcendentalist, spiritualist and a romantic interest of Edgar Allan Poe (died 1878)
 February 2 – Albert Sidney Johnston, Confederate general (died 1862)
 April 30 – Jeremiah E. Cary, politician (died 1888)
 May 25 – Ralph Waldo Emerson, essayist and poet (died 1882)
 June 4 – Gabriel J. Rains, Confederate brigadier general (died 1881)
 June 25 – Sumner Lincoln Fairfield, poet and teacher (died 1844)
 July 10 – William Todd, businessman, Canadian senate nominee (died 1873)
 July 16 – Sarah Yorke Jackson, Acting First Lady of the United States (died 1887)
 July 24 – Alexander Jackson Davis, Gothic architect (died 1892)
 August 18 – Nathan Clifford, Associate Justice of the Supreme Court of the United States (died 1881)
 August 27 – Edward Beecher, theologian (died 1895)
 September 3 – Prudence Crandall, educationist (died 1890)
 September 4 – Sarah Childress Polk, First Lady of the U.S. (died 1891)
 September 27 – Samuel Francis Du Pont, rear admiral (died 1865)
 September 29 – Mercator Cooper, sea captain (died 1872)
 October 3 – John Gorrie, physician and inventor of mechanical cooling (died 1855)
 October 21 - Solon Robinson, founder of Crown Point, Indiana (died 1880)
 October 24 – Albert Smith White, U.S. Senator from Indiana from 1839 to 1845 (died 1864)
 November 14 – Jacob Abbott, children's writer (died 1879)
 December 18 or 27 – William Allen, U.S. Senator from Ohio from 1837 to 1849 (died 1879)

Deaths
 February 22 – Jacques-Donatien Le Ray de Chaumont, "Father of the American Revolution" (born 1726 in France; died in France)
 May 14 – William Smith, Episcopalian priest, educator, theologian, poet and historian (born 1727)
 June 24 – Matthew Thornton, signatory of the Declaration of Independence (born 1714 in Ireland)
 September 13 – John Barry, first commissioned U.S. naval officer (born 1745 in Ireland)
 September 27 – Frances Brett Hodgkinson, actress (born 1771 in Great Britain)
 October 2 – Samuel Adams, a Founding Father of the U.S. (born 1722)
 December 30 – Francis Lewis, signatory of the Declaration of Independence (born 1713 in Wales)
 William Verstille, portrait artist (born c. 1757)

See also
Timeline of United States history (1790–1819)

Further reading
 
 Lewis Leary. Leigh Hunt in Philadelphia. An American Literary Incident of 1803. The Pennsylvania Magazine of History and Biography, Vol. 70, No. 3 (July, 1946), pp. 270–280
 Robert Mills, Hennig Cohen. An Unpublished Diary by Robert Mills, 1803. The South Carolina Historical and Genealogical Magazine, Vol. 51, No. 4 (October, 1950), pp. 187–194

External links
 

 
1800s in the United States
United States
United States
Years of the 19th century in the United States